Ben Hoogstede (16 March 1888 – 22 July 1962) was a Dutch footballer. He played in four matches for the Netherlands national football team in 1921.

References

External links
 

1888 births
1962 deaths
Dutch footballers
Netherlands international footballers
Place of birth missing
Association footballers not categorized by position